Big Australia was a term used by former Australian Prime Minister Kevin Rudd to describe an increase in the population of Australia from 22 million in 2010 to 36 million in 2050, along with the policies needed to react to it. 

In 2009, Rudd stated that he was in favour of a "big Australia" in response to a demographic projection in the Government's Intergenerational Report, which showed that the population of Australia would increase from 22 million in 2010 to 35 million in 2050. A portion of the growth involved continued high rates of immigration to Australia, which proved controversial. In April 2010, Rudd appointed Tony Burke to the position of Minister for Population and asked him to develop a population policy.

Julia Gillard, who ousted Rudd from office in June 2010, stated shortly after taking over that she did not support Rudd's position. In her opinion, a "big Australia" would be unsustainable. Gillard's position was "a sustainable Australia, not a big Australia". The Government released a "sustainable population strategy" in May 2011, which did not specify a target population. In October 2011 trade minister Craig Emerson released a paper with Gillard's approval that advocated for continued rapid rates of population growth.

Demographic projections released by the Queensland Centre for Population Research in 2011 found that there is a 50 per cent likelihood of Australia's population being larger than 35 million by 2050. Similarly, the latest ABS projections (3222.0) have a midpoint projection of 37.1 million for 2050. These projections always assume net migration of at least 175,000, a figure unknown to Australia before 2006, when John Howard achieved 182,000.

References

Further reading

Political history of Australia
Demographics of Australia